Valerie King may refer to:
Valerie King, Canadian and American computer scientist
Valerie King, pseudonym of romance novelist Caris Roane
Valerie King, flutist for hip-hop band Novakane
Valerie King, assistant coach of Wright State Raiders women's basketball
Valerie King, candidate in the Sheffield City Council election, 1988
Valerie King, fictional character in the 1943 film Passport to Suez
Valerie King, fictional character in the television series Secrets and Words